The Oxford Girl and Other Stories is a 2008 acoustic compilation album by British folk rock band Oysterband.

Track listing
 The Early Days of a Better Nation (Ian Telfer / John Jones) 4'08"
 When I'm Up I Can't Get Down (Ian Telfer / Alan Prosser / John Jones) 3'37"
 By Northern Light (Ian Telfer / John Jones / Alan Prosser / Chopper) 4'23"
 Blood-Red Roses (Alan Prosser / Ian Telfer) 2'36"
 The Soul's Electric (Chopper / John Jones / Lee Partis / Alan Prosser / Ian Telfer) 2'47"
 The Oxford Girl (John Jones / Ian Telfer) 4'05"
 Little Brother (John Jones / Alan Prosser / Ian Telfer) 3'30"
 What Wondrous Love Is This? (Trad Arr The Sacred Harp Publishing Co.) 2'08"
 Angels Of The River (John Jones / Ian Telfer) 4'29"
 After Rain (John Jones / Alan Prosser / Ian Telfer / Strings Intro – Alan Prosser) 4'08"
 Shouting About Jerusalem (Chopper / John Jones / Lee Partis / Alan Prosser / Ian Telfer) 3'12"
 The Lakes of Cool Flynn (Trad Arr John Jones / Alan Prosser / Chopper) 3'36"
 The False Knight On The Road (Trad Arr John Jones / Alan Prosser / Chopper) 3'59"
 Put Out The Lights (Ian Telfer / Alan Prosser) 5'06"

References 

2008 albums
Oysterband albums